Bahmanan (also Romanized as Bahmanān) is a village in Kaseliyan Rural District, in the Central District of Savadkuh County, Mazandaran Province, Iran. At the 2006 census, its population was 73, in 25 families.

References 

Populated places in Savadkuh County